Bedford Hall is a late-medieval-house in Bedford, Leigh, Greater Manchester, England. It was leased to tenants by the Kighleys, absent lords of the manor of Bedford, and has been modified several times over the centuries becoming a farmhouse and now two houses. It was one of a group of timber-framed medieval halls, including Morleys Hall in Astley, located to the north of Chat Moss. It is a Grade II Listed building.

In 1291 the hall was in the possession of Adam de Sale who held it from the de Kighleys. In 1303 William de la Doune was accused of demolishing the hall which had two chambers and another for esquires which he said was ruinous and unroofed. With the permission of the Kighleys a new hall with two chambers and a kitchen was built.

References
Citations

Grade II listed buildings in the Metropolitan Borough of Wigan
Houses in Greater Manchester
Buildings and structures in Leigh, Greater Manchester